Ana Rodríguez (born 23 April 2002) is a Panamanian footballer who plays as a defender for CAI and the Panama women's national team.

Career
Rodríguez has appeared for the Panama women's national team, including in the 2020 CONCACAF Women's Olympic Qualifying Championship on 31 January 2020 against the United States, coming on as a substitute in the 63rd minute for María Guevara.

See also
 List of Panama women's international footballers

References

External links
 

2002 births
Living people
Panamanian women's footballers
Women's association football defenders
Panama women's international footballers